Baha' Faisal Mohammad Seif (born 30 May 1995) is a Jordanian footballer who plays for Al-Shamal and the Jordan national football team.

International career 
Baha' played his first match with the Jordan national senior team against Bangladesh in the 2018 FIFA World Cup qualification on 24 March 2016, which resulted in an 8–0 win for Jordan.

International goals

With U-17

With U-19

With U-23

Senior team 
Scores and results list Jordan's goal tally first.

International statistics

References

External links 
 
 

1995 births
Living people
Jordanian footballers
Jordanian expatriate footballers
Jordan international footballers
Jordan youth international footballers
Association football forwards
Al-Wehdat SC players
Kuwait SC players
Al-Shamal SC players
Qatari Second Division players
Qatar Stars League players
Expatriate footballers in Kuwait
Expatriate footballers in Qatar
Jordanian people of Palestinian descent
2019 AFC Asian Cup players
Jordanian expatriate sportspeople in Kuwait
Kuwait Premier League players
Jordanian expatriate sportspeople in Qatar
Jordanian Pro League players